Paula or PAULA may refer to:

Arts and entertainment

Fictional characters
 Paula, in video game EarthBound
 Paula, in The Larry Sanders Show
 Paula Campbell (EastEnders), in 2003

Film and television
 Paula (1915 film), a silent film
 Paula (1952 film), an American drama
 Paula (2011 film), a Canadian animation
 Paula (2016 film), a German film
 Paula (TV series), 2017

Music
 Paula (album), by Robin Thicke, 2014
 "Paula" (Zoé song), 2006
 "Paula", a 1972 song by Monica Verschoor
 "Paula", a 1981 song by Tim Weisberg

People
 Paula (given name), including a list of people with the name
 Paula of Rome (347–404), ancient Roman saint
Paula (surname)

Other uses
 Paula (computer chip), the sound chip of the Commodore Amiga computer
 Paula (novel), memoir by Isabel Allende, 1994
 Paula (1876 barque), a German ship from which was sent the longest travelled message in a bottle
 Paula (insect), a synonym for a genus of praying mantises, Gonypetyllis
 Paula gas field, on the continental shelf of the Black Sea
 PAULA, Possession of Alcohol Under the Legal Age, otherwise known as Minor in Possession
 Hurricane Paula, in Honduras and Cuba in 2010
 Cyclone Paula, in Vanuatu, 2001
 Operation Paula, a German Luftwaffe operation in the Second World War

See also 

 Paola (disambiguation)
 Paul (disambiguation)
 Paulina (disambiguation)
 Paulino, a given name and surname
 Pavla, a given name